Broderick Phillip Perkins (born November 23, 1954) is an American former professional baseball player. He played all or parts of seven seasons in Major League Baseball, from 1978 until 1984, for the San Diego Padres and Cleveland Indians, primarily as a first baseman. His only season as a full-time player was 1982, when he played in 125 games for the Padres, batting .271.

Born in Pittsburg, CA, Perkins was selected by the San Diego Padres in the 15th round of the 1976 draft, making his major league debut for them on July 7, 1978.  He played 5 seasons for the Padres, becoming their starting first baseman in 1982, appearing in 125 games.

In 1982 he was traded by the Padres along with Juan Eichelberger to the Cleveland Indians for Ed Whitson.  He played the 1983 and 1984 seasons for the Indians, splitting his time in the outfield and first base. His final major league game was on September 23, 1984 as the Indians released him on October 15, 1984.

References

Sources

Major League Baseball first basemen
San Diego Padres players
Cleveland Indians players
Walla Walla Padres players
Amarillo Gold Sox players
Hawaii Islanders players
Saint Mary's Gaels baseball players
Miami Marlins (FSL) players
Baseball players from California
African-American baseball players
1954 births
Living people
People from Pittsburg, California
21st-century African-American people
20th-century African-American sportspeople